Jonathan Leaf is a playwright, screenwriter, author and journalist based out of New York City. He is the writer of the off-Broadway play The Caterers, which was nominated for Best Full-Length Original Script of 2005-2006 in the Innovative Theater Awards.

In June 2006, he was featured in Time Out New York magazine in an article on America's most important young playwrights and compared to Nobel Prize-winning author Saul Bellow for his "literacy and seriousness".

Leaf's follow-up to The Caterers was The Germans In Paris. Praised by The New Yorker, The Wall Street Journal and Broadwayworld.com, among others, the play ran in January 2007 at the Upper West Side's Arclight Theater. During the course of its four-week run, it was the highest rated show in New York according to audience surveys on the Theatermania website.

A New York City public school teacher, Leaf has written both about education and about the arts and culture for such publications as The Weekly Standard, The New York Sun, The New Yorker, The New York Post, The New York Daily News, The American and National Review. Leaf has also been a contributor and editor at the Web journal New Partisan, and he has written for The New York Press, where he served as the Arts editor.

In 2009, Leaf published his first full-length nonfiction book, The Politically Incorrect Guide to the Sixties, in which he attacks popular perceptions of the 1960s as a radical decade dominated by hippies, rock music and free love.

Leaf's 2017 play, The Fight, turned a spotlight on the internecine battles among Second Wave feminists.

Leaf’s recent dramatic play “Pushkin,” premiered at New York's Sheen Center in the summer of 2018. The Wall Street Journal's Terry Teachout called it 'one of the best new plays to open in New York in recent memory.’ The National Association of Scholars President Peter Wood, in a review, wrote that it was 'an extraordinary achievement...Leaf has created a work that will stand the test of time.’ Teachout subsequently named the play one of his four best new plays of 2018.

References

External links
Terror, Up-Close and Personal Review written by theater critic and author Terry Teachout.
Catering off-off-Broadway Review written by theater critic and author Mark Steyn.
 Official Website of the Author
 Review of The Germans In Paris written by critic Terry Teachout.
 Review of The Germans In Paris written by critic Steve Weinstein.
 Review of The Germans In Paris written by critic Duncan Pflaster.
 Review of The Germans In Paris written by critic Peter McKay.
 Includes profile of Jonathan Leaf by New York Drama Critics Circle head Adam Feldman.
New Partisan Archive of pieces written for NP. 
The Situation With Tucker Carlson Transcript of discussion panel involving Leaf. 
The Truth About Fashion Week

Year of birth missing (living people)
Living people
American dramatists and playwrights
New York Press people
The New Yorker people
The New York Sun people